Manuel Martín Cuenca (born 30 November 1964) is a Spanish film director. He directed more than ten films since 1990.

Selected filmography 
 The Weakness of the Bolshevik (2003)
 Hard Times (2005)
 Half of Oscar (2010)
 Cannibal (2013)
 The Motive (2017)
 The Daughter (2021)

Awards

References

External links 
 

1964 births
Living people
Spanish film directors
21st-century Spanish screenwriters